Timothy Robert Hunter (born September 10, 1960) is a Canadian former professional ice hockey player, and head coach most recently the head coach of the Moose Jaw Warriors  of the Western Hockey League (WHL), having previously served as an assistant coach in the National Hockey League (NHL), most recently for the Washington Capitals. Chosen in the 3rd round of the 1979 NHL Entry Draft (#54 overall) by the Atlanta Flames, Hunter went on to a 16-season playing career with the Calgary Flames, Quebec Nordiques, Vancouver Canucks, and San Jose Sharks.

Playing career 
Hunter was on the Flames' 1989 Stanley Cup championship team, and also appeared in the Stanley Cup Finals in 1986 with Calgary and in 1994 with Vancouver. During his playing days, Hunter was known for his fierce style of play, ranking him among hockey's unwritten list of elite enforcers during the 1980s and 1990s. He also was a quality defensive player and penalty killer.

Coaching career 
Tim Hunter was named as an assistant coach for the Washington Capitals on July 23, 1997, and remained in that position until July 15, 2002. He became an assistant coach with the San Jose Sharks on December 6, 2002, and served through the 2007-08 season. Named as an assistant coach with the Toronto Maple Leafs on July 22, 2008, Hunter was relieved of that position on June 20, 2011. He was re-hired as an assistant coach of the Capitals on July 23, 2012.

Hunter's contract in Washington was not renewed for 2013, and after being linked to several coaching  positions in the WHL, he was named as head coach of Moose Jaw Warriors of the Western Hockey League (WHL) in July 2014.

On January 6, 2020 at a team press conference, Tim Hunter was fired from the Moose Jaw Warriors.

NHL awards and honours 
NHL Bud Man of the Year (nominee)
NHL Bill Masterton Memorial Trophy (2-time nominee)
NHL King Clancy Memorial Trophy (2-time nominee)
Calgary Flames Ralph T. Scurfield Humanitarian Award (Winner)
NHL penalty-minutes leader: 1986-87 (Calgary - 361 PIM), 1988-89 (Calgary - 375 PIM)
NHL Playoffs penalty-minutes leader: 1983 (Calgary - 70 PIM)
Calgary Flames team record: Most career penalty minutes (2,405)
Calgary Flames team record: Most penalty minutes in one season (375 in 1988-89)
Calgary Flames team record: Most penalty minutes in one playoff year (108 in 1986)

Career statistics

See also 
List of NHL players with 2000 career penalty minutes

References

External links 
 
 HockeyDraftCentral.Com

1960 births
Living people
Atlanta Flames draft picks
Birmingham Bulls (CHL) players
Calgary Flames players
Canadian ice hockey right wingers
Colorado Flames players
Moose Jaw Warriors coaches
Nova Scotia Voyageurs players
Oklahoma City Stars players
Quebec Nordiques players
San Jose Sharks coaches
San Jose Sharks players
Seattle Breakers players
Ice hockey people from Calgary
Stanley Cup champions
Toronto Maple Leafs coaches
Vancouver Canucks players
Washington Capitals coaches
Canadian ice hockey coaches